"Rebellion (Lies)" is a song by Canadian indie rock band Arcade Fire. It was the fourth single released from the band's debut album, Funeral. The single was released in both CD and DVD formats with the song "Brazil" as the B-side. The single peaked at number 19 on the UK singles chart, the band's best performance on this chart to date. On the album Funeral, "Rebellion (Lies)" immediately follows the song "Haiti", the ending of which has the same bass beat and leads right into the beginning of "Rebellion (Lies)". The song has enduringly been the band's closing song at appearances at music festivals and at the end of most of their shows. In October 2011, British pop singer Sophie Ellis-Bextor released a cover in support of Songs to Save a Life, a benefit project in aid of Samaritans.

Accolades
The song was one of three tracks mentioned in the band's nomination — and win — of the 2006 Juno Award for Songwriter of the Year. The song was also nominated for Best Independent Video at the 2005 MuchMusic Video Awards.

In May 2007, NME magazine named the song as #29 in its list of the "50 Greatest Indie Anthems Ever". In April 2009, the song was featured in Blender magazine's "500 Greatest Songs Since You Were Born" as #380. In August 2009, the song was ranked #69 in Pitchfork Media's Top 500 Tracks of the 2000s. In 2009, NME ranked the song as the 9th best of the 2000s and in October 2011 they named it as 2nd in their list of the 150 greatest songs from the past 15 years.

Appearances
The song was featured on a season 5 episode of the television series Six Feet Under.

This song was originally intended to be used during the closing scene of the pilot for the television series The Black Donnellys, but the band refused to grant the rights for its use. Snow Patrol's "Open Your Eyes" was used instead.

In 2006, the song was featured in a commercial promoting Bono's Product Red campaign.

In 2011, filmmaker Matthew Wisniewski set his footage of the Wisconsin Uprising to the song.

Track listing
"Rebellion (Lies)" – 5:05
"Brazil" – 3:54

Personnel
Win Butler - vocals, Jaguar electric guitar
Régine Chassagne - piano, backing vocals
Richard Reed Parry - Rickenbacker electric guitar, backing vocals, engineer, recording
Tim Kingsbury - bass, backing vocals
Howard Bilerman - drums, engineer, recording
Will Butler - percussion, backing vocals
Additional musicians
Sarah Neufeld – violin, string arrangements
Owen Pallett – violin, string arrangements
Michael Olsen – cello
Pietro Amato – horn
Anita Fust – harp

Charts

Certifications

References

2005 singles
Arcade Fire songs
2004 songs
Rough Trade Records singles
Merge Records singles
Songs written by Win Butler
Songs written by Régine Chassagne
Songs written by Tim Kingsbury
Songs written by Richard Reed Parry
UK Independent Singles Chart number-one singles